Robert Michael may refer to:

 Robert Michael (footballer) (1879–1963), Australian footballer for Collingwood
 Robert T. Michael, founding dean of the Harris School of Public Policy Studies at University of Chicago
 Robert Michael (historian) (1936–2010), professor of history
  (1909–1997), American actor

See also
 Robert H. Michel (1923–2017, pronounced Robert Michael), Illinois politician
 Robert Michels (disambiguation)